Stanley Arthur John Smith (8 January 1910 – 1984) was an Australian cricketer. He played 14 first-class cricket matches for Victoria between 1931 and 1936.

See also
 List of Victoria first-class cricketers

References

External links
 

1910 births
1984 deaths
Australian cricketers
Victoria cricketers
Cricketers from Melbourne